Enzo Couacaud and Manuel Guinard were the defending champions but chose not to defend their title.

Sadio Doumbia and Fabien Reboul won the title after defeating Matteo Arnaldi and Luciano Darderi 5–7, 6–4, [10–7] in the final.

Seeds

Draw

References

External links
 Main draw

Gran Canaria Challenger - Doubles